The 2002 Legg Mason Tennis Classic was a tennis tournament played on outdoor hard courts at the William H.G. FitzGerald Tennis Center in Washington, D.C. in the United States and was part of the International Series Gold of the 2002 ATP Tour. The tournament ran from August 12 through August 18, 2002.

Finals

Singles

 James Blake defeated  Paradorn Srichaphan 1–6, 7–6(7–5), 6–4
 It was Blake's 1st singles title of his career.

Doubles

 Wayne Black /  Kevin Ullyett defeated  Bob Bryan /  Mike Bryan 3–6, 6–3, 7–5
 It was Black's 4th title of the year and the 11th of his career. It was Ullyett's 4th title of the year and the 17th of his career.

References

External links
 Official website
 ATP tournament profile

Legg Mason Tennis Classic
Washington Open (tennis)
2002 in sports in Washington, D.C.